These are the TV and radio stations wholly owned and operated by the Intercontinental Broadcasting Corporation  in the Philippines.

IBC Stations Nationwide

Analog

Digital

IBC Radio Stations

AM Station

FM Station

References

See also
 Intercontinental Broadcasting Corporation
 Media of the Philippines

 
Philippine television-related lists